"Oklahoma" is a song written by D. Vincent Williams and John Allen, and recorded by American country music singer Billy Gilman. It was released in October 2000 as the second single from the album One Voice.  The song reached number 33 on the Billboard Hot Country Singles & Tracks chart. and number 63 on the Billboard Hot 100.  The album from the single is taken was certified two-times multi-platinum in the United States.

Content
The song is about a boy reuniting with his birth father after somehow losing his mother and being put into foster care, after which he was shuffled around until his father was discovered.

Chart performance
"Oklahoma" debuted at number 66 on Billboards Hot Country Singles & Tracks chart for the chart week of October 14, 2000.

Notes

References

2000 singles
Billy Gilman songs
Song recordings produced by Don Cook
Epic Records singles
Music videos directed by Trey Fanjoy
Song recordings produced by David Malloy
Song recordings produced by Blake Chancey
Songs written by D. Vincent Williams
2000 songs
Songs about fathers
Songs about Oklahoma